is a drifting driver from Japan. He made his debut in the D1 Grand Prix in the 3rd round in 2001, driving the Blitz D1 Spec ER34 Skyline which he still drives. His nickname is Nomuken (のむけん) or Monkey Magic (as a reference to his company).

In his youth, Nomura was a baseball player and was very well known within his region, but his career never progressed any further through injury and turned to property developing. Once he gained his driving licence, he was dedicated to night-time street drag racing and then progressed to touge racing. In 1992, Nomuken was runner up in the "All Japan Ikaten" Finals and later in 1996 opened his own tuning shop Uras (reverse for saru, Japanese for monkey), producing drift specific products.

When he first joined the D1GP series in 2000, his performance was average, he had been away from drifting for some time before competing in its inaugural year. But as soon as he signed a contract with parts manufacturer Blitz as a works driver, his skills quickly developed.

In the D1 events, he is known for his imitation of a monkey, as the pioneer of the smoke technique, he drifts with the most smoke. He is widely a fan favorite in the series. He also competes in the budget spinoff series, D1 Street Legal with a toned down version of his Skyline.

In 2006, Ken Nomura won the D1GP Non Championship Event World All Star.

He has also appeared for a TV commercial for his sponsor, Dunlop Tires in Japan, appears as a guest presenter in Video Option and Drift Tengoku as well as a columnist for the Option magazine and judges in drift events.

He announced his intention to retire after the 2018 season on Twitter, and ran his last full-time race on Odaiba.

Complete Drifting Results

D1 Grand Prix

References

External links
Company Site
Official site
Blitz official site
D1 Supporter profile

Japanese racing drivers
Japanese baseball players
1965 births
Living people
Drifting drivers
Motorsport announcers
D1 Grand Prix drivers
Baseball people from Fukuoka (city)